The Societad Retorumantscha (Romansh Society, SRR) is the oldest language association devoted to the promotion of the Romansh language.

Established in 1885, its seat is in Chur.

It bears the responsibility of publishing the Dicziunari Rumantsch Grischun.

External links 
 SRR at Lexicon Istoric Retic
 Informaziuns davart la SRR sin las paginas dal DRG

Organizations established in 1885
Cultural organisations based in Switzerland
Chur
Romansh language
Language advocacy organizations